Ballmertshofen Castle is a 16th-century castle located in the Ballmertshofen section of Dischingen in the Heidenheim district of Baden-Württemberg in Germany.  It is located in the south east corner of Ballmertshofen on the road to Giengen and Dattenhausen.  The castle is owned by the community and includes a local art gallery.

See also
List of castles in Baden-Württemberg

References

External links
  Schloss Ballmertshofen 
  Dischingen Town website
  Schloss Ballmertshofen in Castle Inventory Website

Art museums and galleries in Germany